Richard Šmehlík (born January 23, 1970) is a Czech former professional ice hockey defenceman who played in the National Hockey League (NHL). He was drafted in the fifth round, 97th overall, by the Buffalo Sabres in the 1990 NHL Entry Draft.

Šmehlík joined the Sabres for the 1992–93 season, and played there for nine seasons. He left via free agency for the Atlanta Thrashers before the 2002–03 season.

At the trade deadline of the 2002–03 season, Šmehlík was traded to the New Jersey Devils in exchange for a draft pick. Šmehlík would go on to win the Stanley Cup that season with the Devils.  He retired following the season.

In his NHL career, Šmehlík appeared in 644 games, tallying 49 goals and adding 146 assists.  He also appeared in 88 playoff games, scoring 1 goal and recording 14 assists.

Awards
Bronze Medal at 1992 Winter Olympics (with Czechoslovakia)
Gold Medal at 1998 Winter Olympics (with Czech Republic)
 2003 Stanley Cup champion (with New Jersey Devils)

Trivia
The draft pick the Sabres used to select Šmehlík was acquired from the New York Rangers in exchange for Lindy Ruff. Ruff would later become the Sabres' head coach, and Šmehlík would play under him for five seasons.
Richard and his wife, Martina, have two daughters: Adela and Jessica.
Šmehlík appears on the cover of the Czech version of the NHL 2000 video game.

Career statistics

Regular season and playoffs

International

External links

1970 births
Living people
Atlanta Thrashers players
Buffalo Sabres draft picks
Buffalo Sabres players
Czech ice hockey defencemen
Czechoslovak ice hockey defencemen
HC Vítkovice players
HC Dukla Jihlava players
Ice hockey players at the 1992 Winter Olympics
Ice hockey players at the 1998 Winter Olympics
Ice hockey players at the 2002 Winter Olympics
Medalists at the 1992 Winter Olympics
Medalists at the 1998 Winter Olympics
New Jersey Devils players
Olympic bronze medalists for Czechoslovakia
Olympic gold medalists for the Czech Republic
Olympic ice hockey players of the Czech Republic
Olympic ice hockey players of Czechoslovakia
Olympic medalists in ice hockey
Sportspeople from Ostrava
Stanley Cup champions
Czech expatriate ice hockey players in the United States